Konioria was a genus of early land plant with branching axes. Known fossils are of Early Devonian age.

A cladogram published in 2004 by Crane et al. places Konioria in the core of a paraphyletic stem group of broadly defined "zosterophylls", basal to the lycopsids (living and extinct clubmosses and relatives).

Hao and Xue in 2013 used the absence of terminal sporangia to place the genus in the paraphyletic order Gosslingiales, a group considered to have indeterminate growth, with fertile branches generally showing circinate vernation (initially curled up).

References

External links
 Cladogram from 

Zosterophylls
Prehistoric lycophyte genera
Devonian plants
Lochkovian